Jukka Petteri Summanen (born 20 March 1969 in Säkylä, Satakunta, Finland) is a Finnish actor and screenwriter. Summanen has worked mainly as an actor on Finnish television since 1995, while also having appeared in films such as Levottomat, Paha maa and Blackout.

Selected filmography 
 Levottomat (2000)
 Haaveiden kehä (2002)
 Nousukausi (2003)
 Keisarikunta (2004)
 Paha maa (2005)
 FC Venus (2005)
 Blackout (2008)
 Risto (2011)
 The Path of the Righteous Men (2012)

References

External links
 

1969 births
Living people
People from Säkylä
Finnish male television actors
Finnish screenwriters
21st-century Finnish male actors